The Nokia 603 is a Symbian smartphone announced on 13 October 2011. It ships with the Symbian Belle OS. Later with the release of Nokia 808 PureView, an update of Belle Feature Pack 2 was released for the phone. Nokia 603 is a low-cost device featuring a 3.5-inch ClearBlack display, 1.0 GHz processor, and NFC.

Design 
The Nokia 603 is 113.5 mm tall, 57.1 mm wide and 12.7 mm thick. The device shares its design with the Nokia Lumia 710, a Windows Phone handset that was introduced shortly after the 603. The Nokia 603 comes in black or white with the option of six different colored back shells which can be replaced by the user.

There are seven physical buttons present on the device including a volume rocker, lock button, call create and end buttons, menu key and camera shutter key.

Hardware 
The Nokia 603 is powered by a 1.0 GHz ARM 11 processor supported by 512 MB RAM. Graphics are powered by a Broadcom Graphics Processing Unit clocked at 250 MHz with 128 MB RAM. Unlike its sibling Symbian Belle handsets, the processor of the 603 was not overclocked from 1.0 GHz to 1.3 GHz after receiving the Feature Pack 2 software update.

Display 
The 603 features a 3.5" ClearBlack LCD display at 360x640 resolution, or 213 pixels per inch. The capacitive display supports multitouch of two points and is covered by Corning Gorilla Glass. The screen is coated with Nokia's proprietary ClearBlack polarization filter which increases visibility in bright sunlight.

Software 
The Nokia 603 is the workhorse of the new Symbian Belle OS. The operating system has many bug fixes and a smarter user interface than its predecessor Symbian Anna. Later, with the release of Nokia 808 Pureview, a Belle FP2 update was made available for other phones including the 603.

Major updates in the Belle FP2 were seen in the phone including a faster UI with slide unlocking feature, updated browser, updated apps and widgets and finally the Dolby Headphone stereo widening feature and lots more.

Connectivity 
The Nokia 603 comes with a 3G and 3.5G enabled network. Besides it uses the Bluetooth 3.0 and WiFi. Unlike the 808 Pureview and Nokia N8 it doesn't have support for mini HDMI. On the other hand, it can stream live contents through DLNA (also known as Nokia Play in such devices) with a DLNA supported TV. It has a maximum download speed of 14.4 MBPS at HSUPA and a 5.76 MBPS speed at HSDPA. Besides, it also have support for EDGE and GPRS. Besides it uses a quad band at GSM and pentaband at W-CDMA

Multimedia capabilities 
The Nokia 603 is a smartphone with robust multimedia capabilities. With a 5 MP Camera and Dolby Headphone technology (with the Belle FP2 upgrade) built for Music and Video, the device tries its best to provide the user the best multimedia experience.

Music and audio 
The Nokia 603 is much advanced and a tough competitor in case of Music & Audio. Thus, provides the user a great audio experience. It supports 3.5 mm headphones and provides crystal clear sound. Besides, it has two speakers for Active Noise Cancellation or Stereo Recording. 603 comes preloaded with a choice of six equalizers. A Default Preset, Bass Booster, Classic, Rock, Pop and Jazz. Later with the release of Belle Feature Pack 2, an option for Dolby Headphone was added which clarified the music and at the same time, provided the user with a surround sound experience with comfortable hearing. The sound also seems clarified without the headphones, making it a powerful multimedia phone in the market. The Dolby Headphone feature can be shut down and turned on according to user's choice.

Photography 
The Nokia 603 is not that of a kind photographic phone. But still it offers great experience with its 5.0 Megapixel camera. The Camera can shoot photographs and videos at 30 FPS and have a maximum resolution of 2592 x 1944. The camera lacks auto focus and a flash.
Besides, the camera also allows a simple and easy to use interface where you can manually control the features of the photo or click photos by determining the type of scene you are clicking the photo in. Or else, you let the device decide itself proper elements in proper amount to click the photo.

Secondary Camera:
Unavailable

Video 
The Nokia 603 can record and play videos at 720p at 30 FPS with a maximum resolution of 2592 x 1944. Besides, its hardware is also capable of playing a variety of video formats and often, videos at 1080p. The Dolby Headphone option is also available for playing videos. Like the Music player, the Dolby Headphone option can be turned on and switched off according to user's wish.

Performance 
With its 1.0 GHz on board ARM 11 processor it can handle the Symbian Belle OS without any hiccups. A 512 MB RAM is also fitted in to speed up the phone. A Broadcom GPU like that of the Nokia N8 also allows the device to be operated easily. Unlike the N8's 12 Megapixel Carl Zeiss Lens, the Nokia 603 uses a 5 Megapixel Camera for photography and is mostly criticised for lacking an LED Flash. But in spite of these, 603 is a much powerful smartphone in the competitive market where Android has taken the lead.

References

External links 
Nokia 603 official page (English, Nokia Hong Kong)

Nokia smartphones
Symbian devices